is a 1959 Japanese  epic religious fantasy film directed by Hiroshi Inagaki, with special effects by Eiji Tsuburaya. Produced by Toho as their celebratory thousandth film, it was the most expensive Japanese film ever made upon its release and is based on the legends Kojiki and Nihon Shoki and the origins of Shinto. The film was the highest-grossing film of 1959 for Toho and the second highest grossing domestic production in Japan for the year.

The film was shown in Japan in 1959 as Nippon Tanjo (The Birth of Japan) with a running time of 182 minutes, but it was released in the United States in December 1960 as The Three Treasures, edited down to only 112 minutes. It was also shown internationally under the title Age of the Gods.

Plot

The Three Treasures retells the story of the Yamato Takeru legend, and features a recounting of the great battle between Susanoo and the legendary dragon Orochi.

Cast 
 Toshiro Mifune as Prince Yamato Takeru and Susanoo
 Takashi Shimura as Elder Kumaso
 Kōji Tsuruta as Younger Kumaso
 Nakamura Ganjirō II as Emperor Keikō
 Akira Takarada as Prince Wakatarashi
 Kinuyo Tanaka as Princess Yamato
 Ichiro Arishima as Gods of Yaoyorozu
 Yoko Tsukasa as Princess Oto Tachibana
 Kyōko Kagawa as Princess Miyazu
 Setsuko Hara as Amaterasu

Production

Stuart Galbraith IV described the film as a religious epic in the style of director Cecil B. DeMille that featured "virtually every star and bit player on the Toho lot".

Release
The Three Treasures was distributed theatrically in Japan by Toho on November 1, 1959. The film was Toho's most profitable film of the year and second highest grossing domestic film of 1959.  The film was released in the United States by Toho International Company with English-language subtitles on December 20, 1960. This version of the film was cut to 112 minutes.

References

Footnotes

Sources

External links 
 
 

1959 films
1950s Japanese-language films
Japanese epic films
Films set in the 2nd century
Films directed by Hiroshi Inagaki
History of Japan on film
Films with screenplays by Ryuzo Kikushima
Films based on Japanese myths and legends
Films produced by Tomoyuki Tanaka
Films produced by Sanezumi Fujimoto
Toho films
Shinto in popular culture
1950s Japanese films